Laila Zuberi is a Pakistani TV actress who has worked in many Pakistani drama series and has also appeared in the 2016 film Teri Meri Love Story.

Personal life
Laila Zuberi was born on August 18, 1957 in Karachi. She is married to her cousin, Tariq Zuberi. Both have two daughters.

Career
Laila Zuberi started her career as a radio artist. Then in 1980s, she came to television with dramas like, "Koshish" (1984) and "Chhayon" (1988). Since then, she has established herself as a TV actress through a number of television series. She appeared in the Geo TV show "Annie Ki Ayegi Barat" in 2012. She also appeared in another popular Hum TV drama, "Durr-e-Shehwar" in the same year. She also had an appearance in the Hum TV show "Kankar Shaista" in 2013. In 2014, she appeared in the film "Mohabbat Ab Nahin Hogi" in which she played a mother. The serial was broadcast on Hum TV. She also worked on "Laa", another Hum TV project, in the same year. In 2015, she gave another appearance as Ghazala's mother in the film "Jugnoo". The serial was broadcast on Hum TV. She also appeared in the 2016 film "Man Mayal". Laila Zuberi also appeared in "Sila" and the most-watched television serial "Udaari" in the same year. In 2017, she appeared in films such as "Aashna", "Baaghi", and others that are worth mentioning.

She is currently appearing in the serial "Sabaat," which stars Sarah Khan, Usama Khalid, Mawra Hussain, and others who are excellent in their parts.

She has recently appeared in web series The Ending featuring Hassan Niazi, Faizan Shaikh, Haseeb Abbasi

Filmography

Films
 Teri Meri Love Story

Television

Awards
Laila received Pakistan Excellency Award in 2019.

References

External links

1957 births
Living people
Pakistani film actresses
Pakistani television actresses